Claude Aru (born 25 April 1997) is a Vanuatuan international footballer who plays as a midfielder for Port Vila Football League side Shepherds United.

Career statistics

International

References

External links
 Claude Aru at Oceania Football Center

1997 births
Living people
Vanuatuan footballers
Vanuatu international footballers
Vanuatu under-20 international footballers
Association football midfielders
Malampa Revivors F.C. players
Shepherds United F.C. players